Oddevall is a village in Lier municipality, county of Buskerud, Norway. Oddevall and the neighboring village of Sjåstad are regarded as a single community with a combined population of 556 residents as of 1 January 2014.

References

Villages in Buskerud